The 1979–80 Duke Blue Devils men's basketball team represented Duke University during the 1979–80 college basketball season. This was the sixth and final season for head coach Bill Foster, as it was announced on March 3, 1980 that he would join the South Carolina Gamecocks the following season.

Roster

Compiled from multiple sources

Schedule

Compiled from multiple sources

References

Duke Blue Devils men's basketball seasons
Duke
Duke
1979 in sports in North Carolina
1980 in sports in North Carolina